The Standard Code of Parliamentary Procedure (formerly the Sturgis Standard Code of Parliamentary Procedure by Alice Sturgis) is a book of rules of order.  It is the second most popular parliamentary authority in the United States after Robert's Rules of Order.  It was first published in 1950.  Following the death of the original author in 1975, the third (1988) and fourth (2001) editions of this work were revised by a committee of the American Institute of Parliamentarians.  In April 2012, a new book, entitled American Institute of Parliamentarians Standard Code of Parliamentary Procedure (AIPSC) was released.

The Standard Code (TSC) omits several of the motions and sometimes-confusing terminology used in Robert's Rules of Order (RONR). 
The cover quote of the 2001 edition states, "Anyone who has trouble with Robert's Rules of Order will welcome the simplicity of this streamlined guide to parliamentary procedure."  The Standard Code devotes a chapter to the differences between the two works, along with suggestions for those familiar with the Standard Code when participating in organizations that use "Robert's Rules" as their parliamentary authority. AIPSC omits this chapter as well as any other mention of "Robert's Rules".

Robert's Rules of Order versus The Standard Code

References

Further reading

 
 

1950 non-fiction books
Political books
Parliamentary authority